Bonacci is an Italian surname. Notable with this surname include:

 Kirk Michael Bonacci (1990- ) Actor, Comedian, best known for Game On, The Avatars, EuroDisney
 Gary Michael Bonacci (1962- ) CEO Italus Inc, Real Estate, Standardbred Horse Trainer
 Mathew Bonacci AKA Matt Westin, Country music singer, songwriter, musician, Charted Artist
 Cris Bonacci (born 1962), Australian-born producer, songwriter, and musician
 Jim Bonacci, Indie game developer of Happy Wheels, a ragdoll physics-based platform browser game 
 Maria Alinda Bonacci Brunamonti (1841-1903), Italian poet and scholar
 Leonardo Bonacci, better known as Fibonacci, Italian mathematician
 P. A. Bonacci, one of the victims involved in the Franklin child prostitution ring allegations

See also 
 Boni (disambiguation)
 Bonetti (disambiguation)